Janataraj High School, Dudurkote, Hindol, Dhenkanal started with classes from 8th to 10th on the year 1963 and it is one of the oldest High school in Hindol subdivision, Established from more than 50+ years ago. It is part of Dudurkote and central part of Hindol Subdivision, Dhenkanal District. School was established on 1963 and land provided to government for build the school in Dudurkote by Fakira Charan Garnaik, Sarbarakar of Dudurkote Hindol Princely state and his family members with peoples of Dudurkote.

Brief History of the Public Authority 
Janata Raj High School, Dudurkote, Dhenkanal Circle is a Government educational institution imparting education in High School level. This Institution was established on 1963 in the district of Dhenkanal. It extends teaching facilities in humanities, Social Science & Physical Sciences etc. The main objective of this institution is to disseminate knowledge to the students in different fields. Simultaneously this institution also aims at the overall development of the students, curricular, Co-curricular and extracurricular are also an integral part of this institution which inspires the students to be physically fit. There are also many societies, association and different clubs related to social service and cultural programme, J.R.C Scouts & Guide Eco Club, Red Ribbon Club, Science Club, Legal Literacy Club.

Details and Address 
School Name : Janataraj High School, Dudurkote
Address : Dudurkote, Dhenkanal, Orissa, Postal Code: 759020 India 
Location: Dudurkote Town
Subdivision : Hindol 
School Type : Co-Educational 
School Category : Upper Primary with Secondary 
School Management : Department of Education 
Mid-Day Meal : Provided and Prepared in School Premises 
Medium of Instruction : Oriya 
Founded In Year : 1963 
Location Type: Rural 
School Building Type : Government Building 
No. of Books in Library : 1626 
No. of Computers : Not Specified 
No. of Class Rooms : Not Specified 
No. of Teachers: 7 
Classes : Class 6 to 10 
Drinking Water Type : Hand-Pump 
Playground : Yes
Books Library: Yes
Residential Facility: Yes
Pre-Primary Section : NO
Medical Check-Up : Yes
Computer Aided Learning: No
Ramps for Disabled : NO

Reference Links 
http://www.rtiodisha.gov.in/Pages/printAllManual/office_id:7012/lang:

http://www.icbse.com/schools/janataraj-hs-dudurkote/21140403001

External links 
http://studychacha.com/discuss/99423-janataraj-high-school.html

http://www.alumni.net/Asia/India/Orissa/Dhenkanal/Janataraj_High_School,_Dudurkote/

Schools in Odisha
1963 establishments in Orissa
Educational institutions established in 1963